Daping is a town in Rucheng County, Hunan province of China.

References

Towns of Chenzhou
Rucheng